Bets ter Horst (2 February 1908 – 9 March 1997) was a Dutch sprinter. She competed in the women's 100 metres at the 1928 Summer Olympics.

References

External links
 

1908 births
1997 deaths
Athletes (track and field) at the 1928 Summer Olympics
Dutch female sprinters
Olympic athletes of the Netherlands
Sportspeople from Hengelo
Olympic female sprinters